Hidden Treasure (foaled 1957 in Ontario) is a Canadian Champion Thoroughbred racehorse who was voted Horse of the Year in 1961.

Background
Hidden Treasure was a bay horse and raced by prominent horseman, Bill Beasley. He was sired by the 1953 Kentucky Derby winner, Dark Star. His dam was Ratine, a daughter of the undefeated 1935 English Triple Crown winner, Bahram. He was trained by Robert Bateman.

Racing career
Hidden Treasure won the 1959 Display, Carleton and Summer Stakes and ran second to Victoria Park in the two most important races for Canadian two-year-olds, the Cup and Suaucer and Coronation Futurity Stakes.  As a three-year-old, Hidden Treasure won a number of important races but after stepping on a nail, ran fifth in the 1960 Queen's Plate before winning the Breeders' Stakes. Following a year in which Hidden Treasure's wins included the 1961 Durham Cup, Canadian Maturity, Connaught Cup and Jacques Cartier Stakes, the then four-year-old was voted Canadian Horse of the Year honours. At five, Hidden Treasure won the 1962 Fort Erie Handicap while setting a new Fort Erie Racetrack track record for 6.5 furlongs and at age six won the Canadian Handicap.

Stud record
Retired to stud duty, Hidden Treasure sired a limited number of horses in a short career. Through his daughter Fiddly Dee he is the damsire of Fiddle Dancer Boy, winner of the 1981 Queen's Plate.

Pedigree

References
 Hidden Treasure's pedigree and partial racing stats
 July 9, 1961 New York Times article on Hidden Treasure winning the Canadian Maturity Stakes

1957 racehorse births
Racehorses bred in Ontario
Racehorses trained in Canada
Horse racing track record setters
Canadian Thoroughbred Horse of the Year
Thoroughbred family 17-b